Ischionodonta lansbergei is a species of beetle in the family Cerambycidae. It was described by Auguste Lameere in 1884.

References

Ischionodonta
Beetles described in 1884
Taxa named by Auguste Lameere